This article describes the qualification for the 2023 Men's European Volleyball Championship.

Qualification
Italy, North Macedonia, Bulgaria and Israel as host countries were directly qualified. The eight best placed teams at the 2021 edition also gained direct entries into the tournament. 24 teams compete for the remaining 12 places at the final tournament.

Direct qualification
All of the hosted countries' teams directly qualified for the tournament. Then, the top eight teams from previous edition also automatically qualified.

 2021 Men's European Volleyball Championship final standing

Format
There being seven pools of either three or four teams each, the winners of each pool and the 5 best runners-up qualified for the 2023 European Championship. The pools were played in a double round-robin tournaments format officially from 3 to 21 August 2022, according to the CEV web site. Since there was a different number of teams across the seven pools, the results of the matches played with the teams finishing last in the pools of four were discarded in order to determine the five best runners-up across all pools.

Pools composition
The pools were set following the Serpentine system according to their European Ranking for national teams as of January 2022. Rankings are shown in brackets.

Pool standing procedure
 Number of matches won
 Match points
 Sets ratio
 Points ratio
 If the tie continues as per the point ratio between two teams, the priority will be given to the team which won the last match between them. When the tie in points ratio is between three or more teams, a new classification of these teams in the terms of points 1, 2 and 3 will be made taking into consideration only the matches in which they were opposed to each other.

Match won 3–0 or 3–1: 3 match points for the winner, 0 match points for the loser
Match won 3–2: 2 match points for the winner, 1 match point for the loser

Results
The winners in each pool and the top five of the second ranked teams qualified for the 2023 European Championship.

Pool A

|}

|}

Pool B

|}

|}

Pool C

|}

|}

Pool D

|}

|}

Pool E

|}

|}

Pool F

|}

|}

Pool G

|}

|}

Ranking of the second placed teams
Matches against the fourth placed team in each pool were not included in this ranking.
The top five of the second placed teams qualified for the 2023 European Championship.

|}

Notes

References

External links
Official website

Q
2022 in men's volleyball